Geoffrey Hutt (born 28 September 1949) is an English former professional footballer born in Hazelwood, Duffield, Derbyshire, who played as a left back in the Football League for Huddersfield Town, Blackburn Rovers, York City and Halifax Town, and in the Eredivisie for Haarlem.

References

1949 births
Living people
People from Duffield
Footballers from Derbyshire
English footballers
English expatriate footballers
Association football fullbacks
Huddersfield Town A.F.C. players
Blackburn Rovers F.C. players
HFC Haarlem players
York City F.C. players
Halifax Town A.F.C. players
English Football League players
Eredivisie players
Expatriate footballers in the Netherlands
English expatriate sportspeople in the Netherlands